USS Gypsum Queen (SP-430) was a tugboat acquired by the United States Navy during World War I. She was assigned to the French coast as a minesweeper, as well as a tugboat to provide assistance to disabled Allied ships. Performing this dangerous work, Gypsum Queen struck a rock near Brest, France, and sunk, sending 15 crew members to their deaths.

Constructed in Camden, New Jersey
Gypsum Queen — a sea-going tug — was built by Dialogue & Company, Camden, New Jersey in 1890, acquired from her owners, J. B. King Transportation Co. of New York City in September 1917; and commissioned on 4 December 1917 at New York City.

World War I service
Turned over to the 3d Naval District, Gypsum Queen was fitted out for overseas service at New York Navy Yard and subsequently served in French ports as a towing vessel and a minesweeper.

Sinking
While returning from rendering assistance to minesweepers foundering off the coast of France, Gypsum Queen struck a rock near Armen Light House off Brest on 28 April 1919 and sank with a loss of two officers and 13 men.

References
 
John H. Dialogue - Dialogue Shipyard

World War I auxiliary ships of the United States
Tugs of the United States Navy
Ships built by Dialogue & Company
Shipwrecks in the Bay of Biscay
1890 ships
Minesweepers of the United States Navy
World War I minesweepers of the United States
Maritime incidents in 1919